Rai Extra was an Italian television channel owned by RAI and broadcast on Digital terrestrial television in Italy.

Initially the channel was called RaiSat Extra. But in 18 May 2010, when Rai rebranded all its channels, the name RaiSat was extinguished, and the channel was renamed Rai Extra.

It broadcasts reruns of popular entertainment, infotainment and news programs produced or co-produced by the state-owned RAI television network.

Since 26 November 2010, the channel is replaced by Rai 5.

Programming 
 AnnoZero
 Ballarò
 Che tempo che fa
 In 1/2 h
 Porta a Porta
 60 Minutes
 Late Show with David Letterman
 The Tonight Show with Jay Leno
 Piloti
 Parla con me
 Cielito lindo
 Libero
 Paolo Limiti Show
 Punto Donna
 Biberon
 10 Hertz                                                                                                                                                                                                                                                                                                                                                                                * SuperGulp!
 MenaBò
 Mixer
 Notte Rock
 Stasera pago io
 I raccomandati
 Telegiornale
 Buonasera con..
 Tante scuse
 3, 2, 1...contatto!
 Controcanale                                                                                                                                                                                                                                                                                                                                                                       * Controfagotto
 Canzonissima                                                                                                                                                                                                                                                                                                                                                                               * Studio Uno
 Milleluci
 Fantastico
 Piccolo Slam
 Speciale per voi

Logos

Closure
The broadcasts of Rai Extra ended after an episode of the sitcom Piloti on November 26, 2010 at 6:30 to make way for the new channel Rai 5. From that moment on, the logo of Rai Extra began to alternate with that of Rai 5 with a countdown at the bottom left that marked the start time of the transmissions of the new channel.

The contents of Rai Extra flowed partly into the RaiPlay web portal and partly onto the Rai Premium television station.

References

Extra
Television channels and stations established in 2003
Television channels and stations disestablished in 2010
Italian-language television stations